Spades is an unincorporated community in Adams Township, Ripley County, in the U.S. state of Indiana.

History
Spades was laid out in 1855. The community's name honors Jacob Spade, a first settler. An early variant name of the community was Spades Depot.

A post office was established as Spade's Depot in 1855, the name was shortened to Spades in 1883, and the post office closed in 1950.

Geography

References

Unincorporated communities in Ripley County, Indiana
Unincorporated communities in Indiana